GRZ may refer to:
 Gold Reserve (company), an American gold mining company
 Graz Airport, in Austria
 Guramalum language